John Montague is the name of:
John Montague (poet) (1929–2016), Irish poet and writer
John Montague (baseball) (born 1947), baseball relief pitcher
John Montague (golfer) (1903–1972), golfer and con man

See also
John Montagu (disambiguation)